Kurtz House may refer to:

Hill-Kurtz House, Griffin, Georgia, listed on the National Register of Historic Places in Spalding County, Georgia
Kurtz-Van Sicklin House, Weiser, Idaho, listed on the National Register of Historic Places in Washington County, Idaho
Kurtz House (Washington, Iowa), listed on the National Register of Historic Places in Washington County, Iowa
T. M. Kurtz House, Punxsutawney, Pennsylvania, listed on the National Register of Historic Places in Jefferson County, Pennsylvania
Adam Kurtz House, Winchester, Virginia, listed on the National Register of Historic Places in Winchester, Virginia